Nir in Iran may refer to:
 Nir, Ardabil, a city in Ardabil Province, Iran
 Nir, Isfahan, a village in Isfahan Province, Iran
 Nir, Yazd, a city in Yazd Province, Iran
 Nir County, a subdivision of Ardabil Province, Iran
 Nir District, a subdivision of Taft County, Yazd Province, Iran